A charity runner is a participant in a road race, usually of half marathon or marathon distance, who raises money or awareness for an established charitable organization. For more elite marathons, such as the World Marathon Majors, runners who are unable to obtain a qualifying time for their gender and age group can gain entry by running for an official charity affiliated with the race. Other races provide charity runners with free race entry, training, team shirts, and encouragement as incentive to raise money for local charities.

The Boston Marathon allows approximately 6000 runners, out of 30,000 into the annual race who have not qualified. Most of these runners have agreed to raise a minimum of $5000 and greater to gain entry into this race.  In 2017, the charity runners raised $34.2 million for over 200 different non-profit organizations.

Relations between qualified runner and charity runners
According to Runner's World magazine, there is often animosity between qualified runners, who have met strict timing guidelines, and charity runners who do not meet the qualifying time, but are given a number for raising money for local charitable organizations and nonprofits. Some runners who meet the published qualifying time do not get into some major marathons due to the sheer volume of entries.

References

Running
Charity fundraising